Max Pettini (born 15 June 1949) is a professor of observational astronomy at the Institute of Astronomy, University of Cambridge.

Pettini was born in Rome but studied for a BSc in physics then a PhD in astrophysics at University College London. He has worked in the UK ever since, apart from four years at the Anglo-Australian Observatory in Epping, New South Wales from 1987 to 1991, and has British citizenship.

His early research obtained observational evidence that verified a prediction that our galaxy is surrounded by a halo of hot ionised gas.

Pettini was awarded the Herschel Medal of the Royal Astronomical Society in 2008. In May 2010, he was elected a Fellow of the Royal Society.

References

1949 births
Living people
Scientists from Rome
20th-century British astronomers
Astronomers at the University of Cambridge
Alumni of University College London
Fellows of the Royal Society